Sisurcana rufograpta is a species of moth of the family Tortricidae. It is found in Ecuador in the provinces of Morona-Santiago and Tungurahua.

The wingspan is about 30.5 mm. The ground colour of the forewings is yellowish brown up to the middle and brownish, densely strigulated (finely streaked) grey postmedially with two reddish rust marks postbasally. The distal third of the wing is dark brown. The hindwings are cream with a slight brown admixture and brownish on the periphery.

Etymology
The species name to the presence of a postbasal mark on the forewing and is derived from Latin rufus (meaning rust) and Greek graptos (meaning marked).

References

Moths described in 2009
Sisurcana
Moths of South America
Taxa named by Józef Razowski